Lieutenant-Colonel Sir Henry Webb, 1st Baronet, JP (28 July 1866, Hereford – 29 October 1940, Caerleon) was a British Liberal Party politician who was Member of Parliament (MP) for Forest of Dean (1911–1918) and Cardiff East (1923–1924), and as Junior Lord of the Treasury (1912–1915).

Biography 

Educated at Lausanne and Paris, known as "Harry", he trained as a mining engineer and became a director of several South Wales collieries. He was High Sheriff of Monmouthshire for 1921 and a JP in three counties.

During World War I, he raised and commanded the 13th Battalion Gloucestershire Regiment and the 13th Battalion Worcestershire Regiment. He also commanded the 23rd (Works) Battalion, the King's Regiment (Liverpool) and the Western Command Labour Centre.

Baronet
On 28 January 1916, he was made a baronet, of Llwynarthen, Monmouth. On his death the baronetcy became extinct.

Marriages
He was married twice: in 1894 to Ellen Williams, who died in 1919; and then to Helena Kate de Paula.

Basil Webb
His only son, Second Lieutenant Thomas Harry Basil Webb (1898–1917), known as "Basil", Welsh Guards, was killed in action in World War I, on 1 December 1917, at the age of 19. Basil Webb had been the model for the famous Welsh sculptor Sir William Goscombe John RA when he produced the bronze sculpture, "The Boy Scout" in 1910. At the age of 12, Basil also composed the Refectory Prayer for Chester Cathedral, which remains in use today. In 1919 Sir Henry Webb bore the costs of renovating the crypt and altar of Chester Cathedral, where an inscription may still be found identifying the restoration work "in memory of his gallant son and his companions".

References

Sources
 Sir Henry Webb, Obituary, The Times, London, 31 October 1940
 "New Lord of the Treasury. A By-Election in the Forest of Dean", The Times, 17 April 1912

External links 
 
 Lady Webb, image, Lafayette Negative Archive

1866 births
1940 deaths
Liberal Party (UK) MPs for Welsh constituencies
Baronets in the Baronetage of the United Kingdom
Members of the Parliament of the United Kingdom for English constituencies
British Army personnel of World War I
Gloucestershire Regiment officers
Worcestershire Regiment officers
King's Regiment (Liverpool) officers
UK MPs 1910–1918
UK MPs 1923–1924
High Sheriffs of Monmouthshire
Members of the Parliament of the United Kingdom for Cardiff constituencies
Military personnel from Herefordshire